Elisabeth Bergner (22 August 1897 – 12 May 1986) was an Austrian-British actress. Primarily a stage actress, her career flourished in Berlin and Paris before she moved to London to work in films. Her signature role was Gemma Jones in Escape Me Never, a play written for her by Margaret Kennedy. She played Gemma first in London and then in the Broadway debut, and in a film version for which she was nominated for the Academy Award for Best Actress. In 1943, Bergner returned to Broadway in the play The Two Mrs. Carrolls, for which she won the Distinguished Performance Medal from the Drama League.

Life and career
She was born Ella (Ettel) Bergner in Drohobych, Austro-Hungarian Empire (present-day Ukraine) to Sara (née Wagner) and Emil (Schmelke Juda) Bergner, a merchant. She grew up in a secular Jewish home. The Hebrew she heard in her childhood was associated with Yom Kippur and Pesach, and on her visits to Israel, she apologized for not knowing the language.

She first acted on stage at age 14, and appeared in Innsbruck a year later. In Vienna at age 16, she toured Austrian and German provinces with a Shakespearean company. She worked as an artist's model, posing for sculptor Wilhelm Lehmbruck, who fell in love with her. She eventually moved to Munich and later Berlin.

In 1923, she made her film debut in Der Evangelimann. With the rise of Nazism, Bergner moved to London with director Paul Czinner, and they married in 1933. Her stage work in London included The Boy David (1936) by J.M. Barrie, his last play, which he wrote especially for her, and Escape Me Never by Margaret Kennedy. Catherine the Great was banned in Germany because of the government's racial policies, according to Time on 26 March 1934.

She was nominated for an Academy Award for Best Actress for the film version of Escape Me Never (1935). She repeated her stage role of Rosalind, opposite Laurence Olivier's Orlando, in the 1936 film As You Like It, the first sound film version of Shakespeare's play, and the first sound film of any Shakespeare play filmed in England. Bergner previously played the role on the German stage, and several critics found that her accent got in the way of their enjoyment of the film, which was not a success. She returned intermittently to the stage, for instance in the title role of John Webster's The Duchess of Malfi in 1946. 

Bergner temporarily returned to Germany in 1954, where she acted in movies and on the stage; the Berlin district of Steglitz named a city park after her. In 1973, she starred in Der Fußgänger (English title: The Pedestrian), which was nominated for an Academy Award and which won the Golden Globe for Best Foreign-Language Foreign Film of 1974. In 1980, Austria awarded her the Cross of Merit for Science and Art, and in 1982, she won the Eleonora Duse Prize Asolo.

Death
She later moved to London, where she died aged 88 from cancer. She was cremated at Golders Green Crematorium on 15 May 1986, where she is commemorated with an oval memorial tablet in the West Cloister.

All About Eve
According to The New York Times obituary for writer Mary Orr,  Bergner told Orr about an experience that provided her with the inspiration for the short story that gave birth to the character of Eve Harrington. "The Wisdom of Eve" appeared  in Cosmopolitan in 1946. The play based on that story was the basis for Joseph L. Mankiewicz's All About Eve. The episode occurred when Bergner was performing in the play The Two Mrs. Carrolls. Bergner took pity on a "waif-like" young woman who stood outside the theater for days on end. She gave her a job as her secretary, and  the young actress tried to  "take over" Bergner's life.

Literary references
The character of Dora Martin in the novel Mephisto by Klaus Mann reportedly is based on her.

Bibliography
 Anne Jespersen: Toedliche Wahrheit oder raffinierte Taeuschung. "Die Frauen in den Filmen Elisabeth Bergners" in Michael Omasta, Brigitte Mayr, Christian Cargnelli (eds.): Carl Mayer, Scenarist: Ein Script von ihm war schon ein Film – "A script by Carl Mayer was already a film". Synema, Vienna 2003;

Partial filmography

The Evangelist (1924) - Magdalena
Husbands or Lovers (1924) - Nju
The Fiddler of Florence (1926) - Renée
Liebe (1927) - Herzogin von Langeais
Doña Juana (1928) - Doña Juana
Fräulein Else (1929) - Else Thalhof
Ariane (1931) - Ariane Kusnetzowa
Dreaming Lips (1932) - Gaby
The Rise of Catherine the Great (1934) - Catherine
Escape Me Never (1935) - Gemma Jones
As You Like It (1936) - Rosalind
Dreaming Lips (1937) - Gaby Lawrence
Stolen Life (1939) - Sylvina Lawrence / Martina Lawrence
49th Parallel (1941) - Anna (replaced by Glynis Johns) (scenes deleted)
Paris Calling (1941) - Marianne Jannetier
The Happy Years of the Thorwalds (1962) - Frau Thorwald
Cry of the Banshee (1970) - Oona
Strogoff (1970) - Marfa Strogoff
The Pedestrian (1973) - Frau Lilienthal
 (1978) - Margarete Johannsen
High Society Limited (1982) - Else

See also
List of German-speaking Academy Award winners and nominees
List of actors with Academy Award nominations

References

External links

Virtual History – Tobacco cards
Elisabeth Bergner profile at Androom Archives

1897 births
1986 deaths
20th-century English actresses
20th-century German actresses
Deaths from cancer in England
German stage actresses
German film actresses
German silent film actresses
Jewish German actresses
Best Actress German Film Award winners
Jews from Galicia (Eastern Europe)
People from Drohobych
Austrian emigrants to Germany
Austrian emigrants to England
Jews who immigrated to the United Kingdom to escape Nazism
German emigrants to England
Ukrainian-Jewish emigrants to the United Kingdom